Sand is a 2011 novel by the German writer Wolfgang Herrndorf. It won the Leipzig Book Fair Prize in 2012. It is the last novel that Herrndorf was able to complete before his death in August 2013.

See also
 2011 in literature
 German literature

References

External links
 Sand at the publisher's website 

2011 German novels
German-language novels
Rowohlt Verlag books